THDC India Limited (formerly Tehri Hydro Development Corporation Limited), is under the ownership of National Thermal Power Corporation Limited, Ministry of Power, Government of India.  It was incorporated in July’88 to develop, operate and maintain the Tehri Hydro Power Complex and other Hydro Projects. THDC India Limited is a Mini Ratna Category-I Enterprise. Present CMD of the corporation is Shri R.K Vishnoi.

At present the company has four power plants in operation namely Tehri Dam (1000 MW), Koteshwar Dam (400 MW), 50 MW Wind project in Patan (Gujarat) and 63 MW Wind project in Dwarka (Gujarat). In addition, more than 10 projects are under various stages of construction. Tehri PSP (1000 MW) and Vishnugad-Pipalkoti HEP (444 MW) are in advance stage and are expected to commission by 2024. THDCIL has also ventured in to thermal power generation with its 1320 MW Thermal Power project coming up near Dussehera village which is near to Khurja, District Bulandshahr, Uttar Pradesh.The project is at advanced stage and is expected to be commissioned by 2024.

THDC signed MOU with Government of Rajasthan to develop 10,000 MW solar parks in the state. THDC is also entrusted to develop 1200 MW Kalia-II and 1750 MW Demwe(Lower) HEP in Lohit basin of Arunachal Pradesh.

NTPC Limited takeover
On 21 November 2019, the Government of India approved the take over of THDC India Limited by NTPC Limited.

See also 

 Uttarakhand Power Corporation Limited

References

Electric-generation companies of India
Government-owned companies of India
Indian companies established in 1988
Companies based in Uttarakhand
1988 establishments in Uttar Pradesh